Under the Whyte notation for the classification of steam locomotives by wheel arrangement, the  is an articulated locomotive of the Garratt type. The wheel arrangement is effectively two  locomotives operating back-to-back or face-to-face, with the boiler and cab suspended between the two power units. Each power unit has no leading wheels, four powered and coupled driving wheels on two axles and no trailing wheels.

Overview
The first Garratt locomotive, K1, one of two  gauge Tasmanian Government Railways K class locomotives built in 1909, has this wheel arrangement and has been restored to operating condition at the Welsh Highland Railway. This arrangement proved one of the less popular Garratt types, since most Garratt locomotives were larger and more powerful, requiring more pairs of driving wheels to operate within the normal axle load limits, and because leading wheels gave more stability and better tracking to allow faster speeds.

In total, 34 Garratts of this type were constructed, seven by Garratt patent holder Beyer, Peacock & Company, mostly for industrial use, and 27 by other builders. The largest user of the type was the C.F. Vicinaux du Mayumbe in the Belgian Congo, with twenty locomotives built to a  gauge by St Leonard in Belgium.

Use

Argentina

The  gauge Southern Fuegian Railway (F.C.A.F.) in Argentina procured a new  Garratt in 1994. Based on Livio Dante Porta's work, it included larger cross section tubing, insulation of the boiler and an improved front end. This vastly improved the economy of this modern steam engine and more than doubled train length.

Accordingly, a second Garratt for this railway was built to similar specifications, but with superheating added, in the workshops of Girdlestone Rail in Port Shepstone, South Africa. It was shipped to Argentina in 2006 and entered service in October of that year. These locomotives had their engine units arranged face-to-face.

Australia

The Tasmanian Government Railways K class was the first class of Garratt locomotive ever produced. They differed from most later Garratts in two respects.
 They were compound locomotives, with two high-pressure cylinders on the rear engine unit and two larger low-pressure cylinders on the front engine unit.
 Their engine units were arranged with their cylinders facing each other, rather than back-to-back as on most other Garratts.

United Kingdom
In addition to K1 at the Welsh Highland Railway, the industrial Beyer-Garratt William Francis, built in 1937, is preserved at the Bressingham Steam Museum. This locomotive had its engine units arranged back-to-back in the usual Garratt fashion.

References

External links

 
 
4,0-4-0